Nikolay Semenyako (born 1976) is a Belarusian cross-country skier. He represented Belarus at the 1998 Winter Olympics in Nagano, and at the 2002 Winter Olympics in Salt Lake City.

References

External links

1976 births
Living people
Belarusian male cross-country skiers
Cross-country skiers at the 1998 Winter Olympics
Cross-country skiers at the 2002 Winter Olympics
Olympic cross-country skiers of Belarus